Mathieu Blanchette (born October 20, 1976, in Quebec City, Quebec) is a Canadian paralympic athlete competing mainly in category T54 long-distance events.

Although Blanchette is a long distance racer and competed in the 2000 Summer Paralympics in the 5000m and 10000m, his only medal, a bronze, came as part of the Canadian 4 × 100 m relay in the same games.

References

1976 births
Living people
Athletes (track and field) at the 2000 Summer Paralympics
French Quebecers
Medalists at the 2000 Summer Paralympics
Paralympic bronze medalists for Canada
Paralympic track and field athletes of Canada
Sportspeople from Quebec City
Paralympic medalists in athletics (track and field)
Canadian male wheelchair racers